1/10,  or 110 may refer to:

1st Battalion, 10th Marines, an American artillery battalion
January 10 in month-day format, a date
October 1 in day-month format, a date
The fraction, one tenth

See also
1:10 radio-controlled off-road buggy
One tenth
Tenth (disambiguation)
110 (disambiguation)